Victor Seliverstov (August 2, 1954, Podilsk, Odessa Oblast) is a Russian political figure and deputy of the 7th and 8th State Dumas. 

From 1971 to 1998, Seliverstov served at the Soviet Armed Forces and, later, Russian Armed Forces. From 1998 to 2004, he worked as Deputy Prefect of the North-Western Administrative Okrug of Moscow. In 2004-2012, Seliverstov headed the regional executive committee in the Moscow city regional branch of the United Russia. On October 11, 2009, he was elected deputy of the Moscow City Duma of the 5th convocation. From 2012 to 2014, Seliverstov worked at the Presidential Administration of Russia. In 2014-2016, he headed the regional branch of the All-Russia People's Front. On September 18, 2016, he was elected deputy of the 7th State Duma. In 2021, Seliverstov was re-elected for the 8th State Duma from the Moscow constituency.

He is one of the members of the State Duma the United States Treasury sanctioned on 24 March 2022 in response to the 2022 Russian invasion of Ukraine.

References

1954 births
Living people
United Russia politicians
21st-century Russian politicians
Eighth convocation members of the State Duma (Russian Federation)
Seventh convocation members of the State Duma (Russian Federation)
Russian individuals subject to the U.S. Department of the Treasury sanctions